Jeffrey A. Harvey (born February 15, 1955 in San Antonio, Texas) is an American string theorist at the University of Chicago.

Scientific contributions
Among Harvey's many contributions to the field of theoretical physics, he is one of the co-discoverers of the heterotic string, along with David Gross, Emil Martinec, and Ryan Rohm. The four physicists were colloquially known as the "Princeton string quartet". 

Harvey is a fellow of the American Physical Society and of the American Academy of Arts and Sciences. He is a trustee at the Institute for Advanced Study in Princeton, New Jersey.

Selected publications

See also
 CGHS model

References

External links
Dr. Harvey's homepage 

American string theorists
Living people
1955 births
University of Chicago faculty
Fellows of the American Physical Society
Trustees of the Institute for Advanced Study
Members of the United States National Academy of Sciences